The Noire du Velay is a domesticated breed of sheep in France.

References 

Sheep breeds
Sheep breeds originating in France